University Oval is a cricket ground at the University of Sydney, in Sydney, Australia.  The first recorded match on the ground was in 1898, when it was the venue for a game between the Australian Universities and A. E. Stoddart's XI. The ground has also hosted a Women's Test match between Australia and New Zealand.

References

Cricket grounds in New South Wales
Sports venues completed in 1898
North East Australian Football League grounds
1898 establishments in Australia